Qumbu is a town in OR Tambo District Municipality in the Eastern Cape province of South Africa.

The town is 61 km north of Mthatha and was founded in 1876. The name is of isiXhosa origin, derived from amazimba aqumbu, ‘the corn has budded’, or ‘the corn is swollen’, referring to a tribal war which occurred at that time of the year. It is also known by its Tribal fights during the  18th century, where Chief Mhlontlo was accused of killing the then Missioner Mr Hamilton Hope who helps in the foundation of the town Magistrate court. Mhlontlo was later arrested in King Williams Town.

Qumbu was the first place in the Eastern Transkei homeland to have a hospital named Nessie Knight in the nearby rural area of Sulenkama founded by the Missioner Mr Peterson. It lies on the north-east side of the Eastern Cape provincial border alongside the N2 route between Mthatha and Mt Frere, and the R396 between Tsolo and Maclear. It is bordered by King Sabata Dalindyebo Local Municipality to the south, Nyandeni Local Municipality to the east, Umzimvubu Local Municipality to the north 

The nearest hospital is Nessie Knight Hospital.

In the 1990s a high level of stock theft in the area resulted in a low-level civil war that engulfed Qumbu and the nearby settlement of Tsolo. This conflict left an estimated 400 people dead. In 2007 the area was still ranked as having one of the highest rates of stock theft in South Africa.

Rural Areas

Qumbu is a hub or an economy centre to a large number of rural locations or areas that some are situated as far as in the boundaries of nearby surrounding towns of Tsolo, Mthatha, Maclear, Mount Fletcher, Matatiele, Lusikisiki and Libode. The list is endless:

Shukunxa
Gqukunqa
Nqakaqeni
Krancolo
Caba (Mission)
Detyana
Mpetsheni
Ngqongweni
Sulenkama
Nonyikila
Matyhamini
Tyirha
Chulunce
Marhambeni
Debeza
Mabholompa
Saphompolo
KwaZulu
Nkwenkweni
Mmangweni
Blackheal
Nontyakasha
Shawbarry
Ramatea
Sophonia
Ngcuthi
Khohlombeni
Mathanga
Mpendle
Katkop

References

Populated places in the Mhlontlo Local Municipality
Populated places established in 1876
1876 establishments in the Cape Colony